Nassarius zanzibarensis is a species of sea snail, a marine gastropod mollusc in the family Nassariidae, the Nassa mud snails or dog whelks.

Description
The length of the shell varies between 5.5 mm and 11.5 mm.

Distribution
This marine species occurs from Mozambique to Pakistan.

References

 Kool H.H. & Dekker H. (2007) Review of the Nassarius pauper (Gould, 1850) complex (Gastropoda, Nassariidae). Part 2, the Western Indian Ocean species, with the description of two new species and introducing a nomen novum. Visaya 2(2): 62–77.

External links
 Galindo L.A., Kool H.H. & Dekker H. (2017). Review of the Nassarius pauperus (Gould, 1850) complex (Nassariidae): Part 3, reinstatement of the genus Reticunassa, with the description of six new species. European Journal of Taxonomy. 275: 1-43

 

Nassariidae
Gastropods described in 2007